Erik Friedlander is an American cellist and composer based in New York City.

A veteran of New York City's experimental downtown scene, Friedlander has worked in many contexts, but is perhaps best known for his frequent collaborations with saxophonist John Zorn.

Friedlander grew up in a home filled with art and music: his father is photographer Lee Friedlander, noted for the cover photographs he took for Atlantic Records. His father's fondness for R&B and jazz helped shape Friedlander's taste in music. He graduated from Columbia University in 1982.

Friedlander started playing guitar at age six and added cello two years later. Apart from his work with Zorn, Friedlander has worked with Laurie Anderson, Courtney Love and Alanis Morissette, and is a member of the jazz/fusion quartet Topaz.

He created the original music for the historical documentary Kingdom of David: The Saga of the Israelites.

Discography
 Chimera (with Chimera) (Avant, 1995)
 The Watchman (with Chimera) (Tzadik, 1996)
 Topaz (with Topaz) (SIAM, 1999)
 Skin (with Topaz) (SIAM, 2000) also released on DVD
 Grains of Paradise (Tzadik, 2002)
 Quake (with Topaz) (Cryptogramophone, 2003)
 Maldoror (Brassland, 2003)
 Eiger (SkipStone, 2006)
 Prowl (with Topaz) (Cryptogramophone, 2006)
 Schio Duomilaquatro (Stella Nera, 2006)
 Giorni Rubati (Bip-Hop, 2006)
 Block Ice & Propane (SkipStone, 2007)
 Volac: Book of Angels Volume 8 (Tzadik, 2007) composed by John Zorn
 Broken Arm Trio (SkipStone, 2008)
 Vanishing Point (A Road Journal DVD)
 Alchemy (SkipStone, 2010)
 50 Miniatures for Improvising Quintet (SkipStone, 2010)
 Chamber Quintet (with Marcin Oles and Bartlomiej Oles)
 Bonebridge (SkipStone, 2011)
 American Power (SkipStone, 2012)
 Claws and Wings (SkipStone, 2013)
 Nothing on Earth (SkipStone, 2014)
 Nighthawks (SkipStone, 2014)
 Illuminations (SkipStone, 2015)
 Oscalypso (SkipStone, 2015)
 Rings (SkipStone, 2016)
 Artemisia (with Throw A Glass) (SkipStone, 2018)

With John Zorn
 Redbird (Tzadik, 1995)
 Filmworks IV: S&M + More (Tzadik, 1997)
 Filmworks VI: 1996 (Tzadik, 1997)
 Filmworks VIII: 1997 (Tzadik, 1998)
 Music for Children (Tzadik, 1998)
 The String Quartets (Tzadik, 1999)
 The Big Gundown: 15th Anniversary Special Edition (Tzadik, 2000)
 Madness, Love and Mysticism (Tzadik, 2001)
 Filmworks X: In the Mirror of Maya Deren (Tzadik, 2001)
 Cobra: John Zorn's Game Pieces Volume 2 (Tzadik, 2002)
 Filmworks XII: Three Documentaries (Tzadik, 2002)
 Filmworks XIII: Invitation to a Suicide (Tzadik, 2002)
 Filmworks XIX: The Rain Horse (Tzadik, 2008)
 Filmworks XX: Sholem Aleichem (Tzadik, 2008)
 What Thou Wilt (Tzadik, 2010)
 The Concealed (Tzadik, 2012)
 Fragmentations, Prayers and Interjections (Tzadik, 2014)

As a member of Bar Kokhba
 1998 The Circle Maker (Tzadik)
 2005 50th Birthday Celebration Volume 11 (Tzadik)
 2008 Lucifer: Book of Angels Volume 10 (Tzadik)

As a member of Masada String Trio
 1998 The Circle Maker (Tzadik)
 2002 Filmworks XI: Secret Lives (Tzadik)
 2003 50th Birthday Celebration Volume 1 (Tzadik)
 2005 Azazel: Book of Angels Volume 2 (Tzadik)
 2010 Haborym: Book of Angels Volume 16 (Tzadik)

As sideman
With Laurie Anderson
 Life on a String (Nonesuch, 2001)
With Cyro Baptista
 Beat the Donkey (Tzadik, 2002)
 Banquet of the Spirits (Tzadik, 2008)
 Infinito (Tzadik, 2009)

With Uri Caine
 Wagner e Venezia (Winter & Winter, 1997)
With Nels Cline
 Lovers (Blue Note, 2016)
With Sylvie Courvoisier
 Abaton (ECM, 2003)

With Dave Douglas
 Parallel Worlds (Soul Note, 1993)
 Five (Soul Note, 1996)
 Convergence (Soul Note, 1999)

With Mark Feldman
 Book of Tells (Enja, 2001)
With Benny Golson
One Day, Forever (Arkadia Jazz, 1999 [2001])
With Myra Melford
The Same River, Twice (Gramavision, 1996)
Above Blue (Arabesque, 1999)
With Mike Patton
 Pranzo Oltranzista (Tzadik, 1997)
With Jamie Saft
 A Bag of Shells (Tzadik, 2010)
With Wadada Leo Smith
 Lake Biwa (Tzadik, 2004)
With Dar Williams
 Mortal City (Razor & Tie, 1996)

Filmography
 Kingdom of David: The Saga of the Israelites (2003)
 Spade (2014)
 Thoroughbreds (2017)
 Oh Lucy! (2017)

References

External links 
Erik Friedlander official site
Erik Friedlander on Brassland Records
Cryptogramophone homepage

1960 births
Living people
Musicians from New York City
Chamber jazz cellists
Tzadik Records artists
Avant-garde jazz cellists
Plastic Ono Band members
Columbia College (New York) alumni
American jazz cellists
Jazz musicians from New York (state)